Santa Maria di Monteverginella is a Roman Catholic church in Naples, Italy. To the right of the facade, is the separate Chapel of Santa Maria della Concezione (Chapel of Holy Mary of the Conception).

History
The building and adjacent monastery was founded in 1314 by the resident of the neighborhood, Bartolomeo di Capua, who was also protonotary of the King Robert of Anjou. The aedicule or ancient shrine of Santa Maria di Alto Spirito was incorporated into the church. In 1588, the complex underwent a partial remodeling by the architect and engineer Vito Alfieri and in the 17th century by Francesco Antonio Picchiatti. The interior decoration in stucco and marble (1726) is due to Domenico Antonio Vaccaro. In 1843, the church was restored by Gaetano Genovese, who eliminated most of the 18th century decorations.

The interior is a Latin cross plan, in the ceiling are three canvases of the  Glory of St Benedict , St Benedict and Benedictine Saints, (1728) by Vaccaro. The main altar was constructed of polychrome marble and pietra dure (1656) by  Dionisio Lazzari. The church frescoes were by Belisario Corenzio.

Bibliography
Vincenzo Regina, Le chiese di Napoli. Viaggio indimenticabile attraverso la storia artistica, architettonica, letteraria, civile e spiriturale della Napoli sacra, Newton and Compton editor, Naples 2004.

External links

The church di Santa Maria di Monteverginella su Napoligrafia

Churches in Naples
Baroque architecture in Naples
14th-century Roman Catholic church buildings in Italy
18th-century Roman Catholic church buildings in Italy